Jonas Mačiulis (born 10 February 1985) is a Lithuanian former professional basketball player. As a member of the senior Lithuanian national team, he earned an All-EuroBasket Team selection in 2015, as Lithuania won the silver medal.

Early years
Mačiulis spent two years competing in the LKAL, the Lithuanian League 2nd Division. He won the 2003 2nd Division title with LKKA-Žalgiris of Kaunas.

Professional career
Mačiulis made his pro debut in 2004, with the Lithuanian League team Nevėžis. He averaged 13.6 points and 5.8 rebounds per game in his only season with the team. Mačiulis was signed by the Lithuanian team Žalgiris in 2005. He helped Žalgiris win a Baltic League title in 2008, two Lithuanian League titles in 2007 and 2008, and two Lithuanian Cups in 2007 and 2008.

Mačiulis made a leap in production in each of the early years of his career. He had a breakout season in 2006–07, averaging 12.7 points and 5.0 rebounds per game in the EuroLeague. Mačiulis averaged a career-high 14.0 points and 5.0 rebounds per game in the 2008–09 season in the Euroleague.

He scored a career-high 29 points against SLUC Nancy on 8 January 2009. In an 8 April 2009 game against the Lietuvos Rytas, Mačiulis set a Lithuanian League record for three-point field goals made in a game, making 8 in a row.

On 1 July 2009, Mačiulis signed with the Italian League team Olimpia Milano. The deal was worth €1.2 million euros net income over two years. Due to a knee injury, which prevented him from playing basketball for 9 months, Olimpia Milano did not offer him a new contract, despite his good performance before he suffered the injury.

On 8 February 2012, he signed with the Lithuanian team Baltai, until he could get a better contract with another team. The deal with Baltai was worth zero LTL (he played there for free). In his first game back after his injury, against Kalev/Cramo, he scored 16 points, grabbed 2 rebounds, and led Baltai to a victory.

On 24 April 2012, he signed with the Italian team Montepaschi Siena for the rest of the season.

On 24 July 2012, he signed a one-year deal with the Greek League team Panathinaikos. On 22 July 2013, he extended his contract for two more years. On 12 June 2014 he was waived.

On 26 July 2014, he signed a two-year deal with Real Madrid. In the 2014–15 season, Real Madrid won the EuroLeague, after defeating Olympiacos, by a score of 78–59, in the EuroLeague Final game. Real Madrid eventually finished the season winning the Spanish League championship, after a 3–0 series sweep in the Spanish League finals series against Barcelona. With that trophy, Real Madrid won the triple crown. He was also voted Lithuanian Player of the Year, for the first time in his career, in 2015, along with Gintarė Petronytė. On 21 May 2016 he signed a new "2+1" contract with the Real Madrid.

On 2 March 2018, he agreed to the termination of the contract with the Real Madrid.

On 6 March 2018, Mačiulis signed with Lokomotiv Kuban of the Russian VTB United League. On 10 July 2018, Mačiulis and Lokomotiv officially parted ways. He signed with AEK Athens on 9 August 2018. Mačiulis signed a contract extension on August 2, 2020.

National team career

Mačiulis was a member of numerous Lithuanian junior national teams. He played at the 2001 FIBA Europe Under-16 Championship. He won a silver medal at the 2003 FIBA Under-19 World Cup, a bronze medal at the 2004 FIBA Europe Under-20 Championship, a silver medal at the 2005 FIBA Europe Under-20 Championship, and a gold medal at the 2005 FIBA Under-21 World Cup.

As a member of the senior men's Lithuanian national basketball team, Mačiulis played at the EuroBasket 2007, where the Lithuanians claimed bronze medals. In the 2008 Summer Olympics, he took 4th place. In the 2010 FIBA World Championship, he won a bronze medal. In the EuroBasket 2013, Lithuania was runner-up, and Mačiulis played one of the best games of his career with national team, in the semi-finals against Croatia.

He was also a member of Lithuania's team at the EuroBasket 2009 and the 2012 Summer Olympics. He also played at the EuroBasket 2015. On 13 September 2015, in the eighth-finals game against Georgia, Mačiulis lead his team to an 85–81 win, posting tremendous numbers: 34 points, 6 rebounds, 3 assists, 4 steals, and 2 blocks. The Lithuanian team later won its second consecutive EuroBasket silver medal, and Mačiulis was included into the All-Tournament Team, after averaging 13.8 points, 6.3 rebounds, and 1.9 steals per game. His teammate, Jonas Valančiūnas, also made the All-Tournament Team.

Career statistics

EuroLeague

|-
| style="text-align:left;"| 2005–06
| style="text-align:left;" rowspan=4| Žalgiris
| 20 || 3 || 15.7 || .372 || .314 || .750 || 2.5 || .4 || 1.0 || .0 || 5.4 || 3.4
|-
| style="text-align:left;"| 2006–07
| 14 || 14 || 29.9 || .431 || .241 || .653 || 5.0 || 1.6 || 2.4 || .4 || 12.7 || 12.9
|-
| style="text-align:left;"| 2007–08
| 20 || 18 || 26.5 || .469 || .377 || .689 || 3.5 || .7 || 1.5 || .1 || 11.9 || 8.8
|-
| style="text-align:left;"| 2008–09
| 10 || 10 || 30.4 || .421 || .411 || .600 || 5.0 || 2.0 || 1.3 || .3 || 14.0 || 12.6
|-
| style="text-align:left;"| 2009–10
| style="text-align:left;" rowspan=2| Milano
| 10 || 9 || 24.0 || .398 || .314 || .724 || 3.8 || 1.7 || 1.3 || .0 || 10.2 || 7.9
|-
| style="text-align:left;"| 2010–11
| 6 || 5 || 23.2 || .472 || .583 || .615 || 3.7 || 1.5 || 1.5 || .3 || 10.8 || 11.5
|-
| style="text-align:left;"| 2012–13
| style="text-align:left;" rowspan=2| Panathinaikos
| 29 || 29 || 24.4 || .472 || .402 || .714 || 4.1 || 1.1 || .8 || .2 || 10.1 || 9.3
|-
| style="text-align:left;"| 2013–14
| 27 || 25 || 23.9 || .412|| .333 || .745 || 4.2 || 1.7 || 1.7 || .0 || 8.1 || 9.6
|-
| style="text-align:left;background:#AFE6BA;"| 2014–15†
| style="text-align:left;" rowspan=3| Real Madrid
| 27 || 7 || 14.0 || .370 || .333 || .724 || 2.4 || 1.0 || .6 || .1 || 3.9 || 4.3
|-
| style="text-align:left;"| 2015–16
| 25 || 19 || 17.5 || .469 || .262 || .828 || 1.8 || .9 || .6 || .0 || 4.7 || 3.7
|-
| style="text-align:left;"| 2016–17
| 29 || 27 || 16.4 || .558 || .500 || .720 || 2.3 || .8 || .7 || .1 || 6.1 || 7.0
|- class="sortbottom"
| colspan=2 style="text-align:center;" | Career
| 188 || 139 || 22.6 || .494 || .346 || .707 || 3.4 || 1.1 || 1.2 || .1 || 8.3 || 8.2

FIBA Champions League

|-
| style="text-align:left;" | 2018–19
| style="text-align:left;" | A.E.K.
| 17 || 23.9 || .379 || .343 || .732 || 4.9 || 1.4 || .8 || .1 || 8.6

References

External links

Jonas Mačiulis at acb.com 
Jonas Mačiulis at draftexpress.com
Jonas Mačiulis at eurobasket.com
Jonas Mačiulis at euroleague.net

Jonas Mačiulis at legabasket.it 

1985 births
Living people
2010 FIBA World Championship players
2014 FIBA Basketball World Cup players
2019 FIBA Basketball World Cup players
Basketball players at the 2008 Summer Olympics
Basketball players at the 2012 Summer Olympics
Basketball players at the 2016 Summer Olympics
Basketball players from Kaunas
BC Nevėžis players
BC Žalgiris players
BC Žalgiris-2 players
Greek Basket League players
Lega Basket Serie A players
Liga ACB players
Lithuanian expatriate basketball people in Italy
Lithuanian expatriate basketball people in Russia
Lithuanian expatriate basketball people in Spain
Lithuanian expatriate basketball people in Greece
Lithuanian men's basketball players
LSU-Atletas basketball players
Medalists at the 2007 Summer Universiade
Mens Sana Basket players
Olimpia Milano players
Olympic basketball players of Lithuania
Panathinaikos B.C. players
Real Madrid Baloncesto players
PBC Lokomotiv-Kuban players
Small forwards
Universiade gold medalists for Lithuania
Universiade medalists in basketball